Maiac (Mayak) is an urban settlement (according to Transnistrian legislation), or city (according to the Moldovan legislation) in the Grigoriopol District, Transnistria, Moldova,  northeast of Grigoriopol, on the Ukrainian border.

History
In the 16th century the village was named Janyk Hisar and Majak Geczit.

Transmitter

The Transnistrian Radio and Television Center (TRTC) is located in Maiac. It is a large broadcasting centre for short- and mediumwave, which was built up in the years between 1968 and 1975. In 1997 two masts – one  and the other  – of the facility used for medium wave broadcasting collapsed as a result of icing.

In October 2007 the Russian unitary enterprise Russian Television and Radio Networks acquired 100% of shares of the TRTC for $3,314,388.

The Grigoriopol transmission station in Pridnestrovje/Transnistru only transmits programs from Trans World Radio  at 1548 kHz. Instead, Radio Rossii from Moscow is now broadcasting on the 999 kHz frequency, since April 5, 2022, around the clock and with a transmission power of 1000 kW.

References

Cities and towns in Transnistria
Cities and towns in Moldova
Grigoriopol District